Gerd Grabher (born 2 November 1953 in Lustenau) is a retired Austrian football referee. He is known for having refereed one match in the 1996 UEFA European Football Championship in England.

A former FIFA referee, Grabher is known to have served as a referee in international matches during the period from 1991 to 1998. Grabher also officiated in 1994 and 1998 World Cup qualifiers and qualifying matches for the 1992, 1996, and 2000 European Championships.

References

External links
Profile

1953 births
Austrian football referees
Living people
UEFA Euro 1996 referees